A safe house is a place of refuge.

Safe house may also refer to:

Books
 The Safe House, a 1975 novel by Jon Cleary
 Safe House, a 2002 novel in the 1-800-WHERE-R-U series by Meg Cabot
 Safe House, a 2006 novel by James Heneghan

Film and television
 Safe House (1998 film), a television film starring Patrick Stewart
 Safe House (2012 film), an action film starring Denzel Washington and Ryan Reynolds
 Safe House (TV series), a 2015 British television series 
 "Safe House" (The Americans), a television episode
 "Safe House" (Brooklyn Nine-Nine), a television episode
 "Safe House" (Supernatural), a television episode

Other
 Safe House Records, a defunct New Hampshire-based record label
 Safehouse Records, an American record label founded in 2015
 "Safe House", a song by All That Remains from the album Madness, 2017
 SafeHouse, a spy-themed restaurant in Milwaukee, Wisconsin